List of hospitals in Kansas, sorted by hospital name.

Sedgwick County
 22nd Medical Group – McConnell Air Force Base (Wichita)
 Ascension Via Christi Behavioral Health Center - Wichita
 Ascension Via Christi Rehabilitation Hospital - Wichita
 Ascension Via Christi St. Francis - Wichita
 Ascension Via Christi St. Joseph - Wichita
 Ascension Via Christi St. Teresa - Wichita
Associated Eye Surgical Center - Wichita
Kansas Heart Hospital - Wichita
Plastic Surgery Center - Wichita
Kansas Spine Hospital - Wichita
Kansas Surgery & Recovery Center - Wichita
Medical Specialists Ambulatory Surgery Center - Wichita
Robert J. Dole VA Medical and Regional Office Center - Wichita
Team Vision Surgery Center West - Wichita
Wesley Medical Center - Wichita
Wesley Rehabilitation Hospital - Wichita
Wichita Specialty Hospital - Wichita
Derby Ambulatory Surgery Center – Derby

Johnson County
AdventHealth South Overland Park - Overland Park, Kansas
AdventHealth Shawnee Mission (formerly Shawnee Mission Medical Center) – Shawnee Mission, Kansas
Children's Mercy South – Overland Park, Kansas
Comprehensive Health of Planned Parenthood of Kansas and Mid-Missouri (PPKM) – Overland Park, Kansas
Menorah Medical Center – Overland Park, Kansas
Mid-America Rehabilitation Hospital – Overland Park, Kansas
Olathe Medical Center – Olathe, Kansas
Overland Park Regional Medical Center – Overland Park, Kansas
Saint Luke's South Hospital – Overland Park, Kansas
Specialty Hospital of Mid-America – Overland Park, Kansas
Kansas City Orthopaedic Institute – Leawood, Kansas

Wyandotte County
KVC Psychiatric Hospital – Kansas City, Kansas
Providence Medical Center – Kansas City, Kansas
University of Kansas Health System – Kansas City, Kansas
University of Kansas Medical Center – Kansas City, Kansas

Shawnee County
Colmery-O'Neil VA Medical Center – Topeka, Kansas
Kansas Neurological Institute – Topeka, Kansas
Kansas Rehabilitation Hospital – Topeka, Kansas
Select Specialty Hospital of Topeka – Topeka, Kansas
Stormont Vail Health – Topeka, Kansas
University of Kansas Health System St. Francis Campus (formerly St. Francis Health Center) – Topeka, Kansas

Other Counties
AdventHealth Ottawa (formerly Ransom Memorial Hospital) – Ottawa, Kansas
Allen County Hospital – Iola, Kansas
Anderson County Hospital – Garnett, Kansas
Anthony Medical Center – Anthony, Kansas
Ashland Health Center – Ashland, Kansas
Atchison Hospital – Atchison, Kansas
Bob Wilson Memorial Grant County Hospital – Ulysses, Kansas
Central Kansas Medical Center – Great Bend, Kansas
Cheyenne County Hospital – Saint Francis, Kansas	   
Citizens Medical Center – Colby, Kansas
Clara Barton Hospital – Hoisington, Kansas
Clay County Medical Center – Clay Center, Kansas
Cloud County Health Center – Concordia, Kansas
Coffey County Hospital – Burlington, Kansas
Coffeyville Regional Medical Center – Coffeyville, Kansas
Comanche County Hospital – Coldwater, Kansas
Community HealthCare System – Onaga, Kansas
Community Memorial Hospital – Marysville, Kansas
Crawford County Hospital District No.1 – Girard, Kansas
Cushing Memorial Hospital – Leavenworth, Kansas
Decatur Health Systems – Oberlin, Kansas
Dwight D. Eisenhower VA Medical Center – Leavenworth, Kansas
Edwards County Hospital & Healthcare Center – Kinsley, Kansas
Ellinwood District Hospital – Ellinwood, Kansas
Ellsworth County Medical Center – Ellsworth, Kansas
Flint Hills Community Health Center – Emporia, Kansas
Fredonia Regional Hospital – Fredonia, Kansas
Fry Eye Surgery Center – Garden City, Kansas
Geary Community Hospital – Junction City, Kansas
Goodland Regional Medical Center – Goodland, Kansas
Gove County Medical Center – Quinter, Kansas
Graham County Hospital – Hill City, Kansas
Greeley County Hospital – Tribune, Kansas
Greenwood County Hospital – Eureka, Kansas
Grisell Memorial Hospital – Ransom, Kansas
Halstead Hospital – Halstead, Kansas
Hamilton County Hospital – Syracuse, Kansas
Hanover Hospital – Hanover, Kansas
Harper Hospital District No. 5 – Harper, Kansas
Hays Medical Center – Hays, Kansas
Heartland LASIK Center – Abilene, Kansas
Herington Municipal Hospital – Herington, Kansas
Hiawatha Community Hospital – Hiawatha, Kansas
Hillsboro Community Medical Center – Hillsboro, Kansas
Hodgeman County Health Center – Jetmore, Kansas
Holton Community Hospital – Holton, Kansas
Hutchinson Regional Medical Center – Hutchinson, Kansas
Jefferson County Memorial Hospital and Geriatric Center – Winchester, Kansas
Jewell County Hospital – Mankato, Kansas
Kansas Voice Center – Lawrence, Kansas
Kearny County Hospital – Lakin, Kansas
Kingman Community Hospital – Kingman, Kansas
Kiowa County Memorial Hospital – Greensburg, Kansas
Kiowa District Hospital & Manor – Kiowa, Kansas
Labette Health – Parsons, Kansas
Lafene Health Center (Kansas State University) – Manhattan, Kansas
Lane County Hospital – Dighton, Kansas
Larned State Hospital – Larned, Kansas
Lawrence Memorial Hospital – Lawrence, Kansas
Lincoln County Hospital – Lincoln, Kansas
Lindsborg Community Hospital – Lindsborg, Kansas
Logan County Hospital – Oakley, Kansas
Manhattan Surgical Center – Manhattan, Kansas
Meade District Hospital – Meade, Kansas
Meadowbrook Rehabilitation Hospital – Gardner, Kansas
Medicine Lodge Memorial Hospital – Medicine Lodge, Kansas
Memorial Hospital – Abilene, Kansas
McPherson Hospital – McPherson, Kansas
Mercy Hospital Columbus - Columbus, Kansas
Mercy Hospital – Moundridge, Kansas
Mercy Regional Health Center – Manhattan, Kansas
Miami County Medical Center – Paola, Kansas
Minneola District Hospital – Minneola, Kansas
Mitchell County Hospital Health Systems – Beloit, Kansas
Morris County Hospital – Council Grove, Kansas
Morton County Health System – Elkhart, Kansas
Munson Army Health Center – Fort Leavenworth, Kansas
NEK Center for Health and Wellness – Horton, Kansas
Nemaha Valley Community Hospital – Seneca, Kansas
Neosho Memorial Regional Medical Center – Chanute, Kansas
Ness County District Hospital No.2 – Ness City, Kansas
Newman Regional Health – Emporia, Kansas
Newton Medical Center – Newton, Kansas
Northeast Kansas Center for Health and Wellness – Horton, Kansas
Northwest Kansas Surgery Center – Hays, Kansas
Norton County Hospital – Norton, Kansas
Osawatomie State Hospital – Osawatomie, Kansas
Osborne County Memorial Hospital – Osborne, Kansas
Oswego Medical Center – Oswego, Kansas
Ottawa County Health Center – Minneapolis, Kansas
Parsons State Hospital & Training Center – Parsons, Kansas
Phillips County Hospital – Phillipsburg, Kansas
Prairie View Psychiatric Hospital – Newton, Kansas
Pratt Regional Medical Center – Pratt, Kansas
Quinlan Eye Surgery & Laser Center – Fort Scott, Kansas
Quinlan Eye Surgery & Laser Center – Pittsburg, Kansas
Rawlins County Health Center – Atwood, Kansas
Republic County Hospital – Belleville, Kansas
Rice County Hospital District No.1 – Lyons, Kansas
Rooks County Health Center – Plainville, Kansas
Rush County Memorial Hospital – La Crosse, Kansas
Russell Regional Hospital – Russell, Kansas
Sabetha Community Hospital – Sabetha, Kansas
Saint Catherine Hospital – Garden City, Kansas
Saint Johns Maude Norton Memorial Hospital – Columbus, Kansas
St. Francis at Ellsworth – Ellsworth, Kansas
Saint John Hospital – Leavenworth, Kansas
Saint Joseph Memorial Hospital – Larned, Kansas
Saint Luke Hospital & Living Center – Marion, Kansas
Salina Regional Health Center – Salina, Kansas
Satanta District Hospital – Satanta, Kansas
Scott County Hospital – Scott City, Kansas
Sedan City Hospital – Sedan, Kansas
Sheridan County Health Complex – Hoxie, Kansas
Smith County Memorial Hospital – Smith Center, Kansas
South Central Kansas Regional Medical Center – Arkansas City, Kansas
Southwest Medical Center – Liberal, Kansas
Stafford District Hospital – Stafford, Kansas
Stanton County Health Care Facility – Johnson, Kansas
Stevens County Hospital – Hugoton, Kansas
Susan B. Allen Memorial Hospital – El Dorado, Kansas
Sumner County Hospital – Caldwell, Kansas
Sumner Regional Medical Center – Wellington, Kansas
Surgery Center of Southwest Kansas – Garden City, Kansas
Trego County-Lemke Memorial Hospital – WaKeeney, Kansas
Via Christi Hospital (Pittsburg) – Pittsburg, Kansas
Wamego Health Center – Wamego, Kansas
Washington County Hospital – Washington, Kansas
Western Plains Medical Complex – Dodge City, Kansas
Wichita County Health Center – Leoti, Kansas
William Newton Memorial Hospital – Winfield, Kansas
Wilson County Hospital – Neodesha, Kansas

Closed
Mercy Health Center – Fort Scott, Kansas (closed in 2018)
Mercy Hospital – Independence, Kansas (closed in 2015)
Rainbow Mental Health Facility – Kansas City, Kansas

References

Kansas
Hospitals